Av Westin (July 29, 1929 – March 12, 2022) was an American television producer. He co-created the CBS Morning News with Mike Wallace. He then went to ABC where he produced World News Tonight and then 20/20. Westin died on March 12, 2022, at the age of 92.

References

External links

1929 births
2022 deaths
American television producers